This is a list of players to have played for the Adelaide Football Club in the Australian Football League (AFL).

Adelaide Football Club players

References

External links
 Full listing of Adelaide players

Players

Adelaide
Football